The 3rd Kostrad Infantry Division (Indonesian: Divisi Infanteri 3 Kostrad) abbreviated "Divif 3/Kostrad", is an army strategic command division of the Indonesian Army. The divisional commander is a two-star Major General. The division's headquarters are in Gowa (South Sulawesi). It is the newest of all the infantry divisions of the Kostrad.

The 3rd Airborne Brigade (Raider) is one of its oldest components, founded on 7 February 1962, but was incorporated into the Division in 2018 after being in the Kopassus and the 1st Kostrad Infantry Division.

Organization
The division's composition are:
3rd Infantry Division HQ command
3rd Airborne Brigade (Raider)
431st Parachute Infantry Battalion (Raider)
432nd Parachute Infantry Battalion (Raider)
433rd Parachute Infantry Battalion (Raider)
20th Infantry Brigade (Raider)
754th Infantry Battalion (Raider)
755th Infantry Battalion (Raider)
6th Field Artillery Battalion
16th Medium Air-Defence Artillery Battalion
Division Combat Engineers Battalion (under formation)
Division Supply and Transportation Battalion (under formation)
Division Medical Battalion (under formation)
14th Cavalry Company
3rd Infantry Division Signal Detachment
3rd Infantry Division Ordnance Detachment
3rd Infantry Division Military Police Detachment
3rd Infantry Division Adjutant General's Detachment

See also
1st Kostrad Infantry Division
2nd Kostrad Infantry Division

References

Divisions of Indonesia
Infantry divisions
Military units and formations established in 2018
Indonesian Army